Cedar Butte a small forested mountain south of North Bend, Washington. It is east of Rattlesnake Lake at the foot of Mount Washington. The summit can be reached by a low-impact hike from the Iron Horse Trail.

References

Mountains of King County, Washington
Mountains of Washington (state)